Agonopterix carduella is a moth of the family Depressariidae. It is found from  Great Britain, Germany and Estonia to the Iberian Peninsula, Sardinia, Italy and Montenegro.

The wingspan is 14–17 mm. Adults are on wing from July to May.

The larvae feed on Arctium, Carduus defloratus, Centaurea jacea, Centaurea nigra, Cirsium arvense, Cirsium helenioides and Cirsium vulgare.
They mine the leaves of their host plant. The mine has the form of a conspicuous, elongated, large, whitish upper-surface blotch, extending on both sides of the mid-rib. Most frass is ejected out of the mine. Pupation takes place outside of the mine. Larvae can be found from May to early July. They are initially yellow-green with a black head. Later instars are dull brownish green or greyish green with a black head. The species overwinters as an adult.

References

External links
lepiforum.de

Moths described in 1817
Agonopterix
Moths of Europe